Freedom and the End of Reason: On the Moral Foundation of Kant's Critical Philosophy is a book by Richard Velkley, in which the author offers an assessment of the position of Kant's philosophy within modern philosophy. Velkley focuses on “critique of practical reason” as the central issue of Kant's thought (not merely the Critique of Practical Reason) and argues that it is a response to the teleological problem of goodness of reason.

References

External links 
 Freedom and the End of Reason

1989 non-fiction books
Books about Immanuel Kant
Books by Richard Velkley
English-language books
University of Chicago Press books
Works about Jean-Jacques Rousseau